Robert Austen (b and d Cork 11 July 1723 - 10 November 1792) was Archdeacon of Cork  from 1785 until his death.

Austen was educated at Trinity College, Dublin Austen  He was the incumbent at Athnowen and a prebendary of Cork Cathedral.

References

1723 births
1792 deaths
Alumni of Trinity College Dublin
Archdeacons of Cork
Clergy from Cork (city)